Yekaterinoslavka is a rural locality (a selo) and the administrative center of Oktyabrsky District of Amur Oblast, Russia. Population: 

It is home to units of the 38th Guards Motor Rifle Brigade of the Eastern Military District.

References

Notes

Sources

Rural localities in Oktyabrsky District, Amur Oblast